Ricardo José Sánchez Lugo (born April 11, 1997) is a Venezuelan professional baseball pitcher in the Chicago White Sox organization. He has played in Major League Baseball (MLB) for the St. Louis Cardinals.

Career

Los Angeles Angels
Sánchez signed with the Los Angeles Angels as an international free agent in July 2013. He made his professional debut in 2014 with the AZL Angels and spent the whole season there, going 2–2 with a 3.49 ERA in 12 games (nine starts).

Atlanta Braves
On January 8, 2015, the Angels traded Sánchez to the Atlanta Braves for Kyle Kubitza and Nate Hyatt. In 2015, Sánchez played for the Rome Braves where he was 1–6 with a 5.45 ERA in ten starts, and in 2016, he returned to Rome, going 7–10 with a 4.75 ERA in 24 games with 23 being starts. He spent 2017 with the Florida Fire Frogs where he compiled a 4–12 record with a 4.95 ERA in 22 games (21 starts).

The Braves added Sánchez to their 40-man roster after the 2017 season. He spent 2018 with the Mississippi Braves, going 2–5 with a 4.06 ERA in 13 starts.

Seattle Mariners
The Seattle Mariners acquired Sánchez for cash considerations on November 28, 2018. Upon joining the organization, Sánchez was considered by MLB.com to be the Mariners' 23rd-ranked prospect. Sánchez was assigned to the Arkansas Travelers at the start of the 2019 season. Sanchez was designated for assignment by the Mariners on January 30, 2020.

St. Louis Cardinals
On February 6, 2020, Sánchez was claimed off waivers by the St. Louis Cardinals. On July 4, 2020, it was announced that Sánchez had tested positive for COVID-19. On August 15, Sánchez was promoted to the major leagues. He made his major league debut the next day against the Chicago Cubs, pitching 2 scoreless innings. On October 20, 2020, Sánchez was outrighted off of the 40-man roster. He became a free agent on November 2, 2020.

On April 30, 2021, Sánchez re-signed with the Cardinals. He did not play in a game in 2021 due to injury. On March 30, 2022, Sánchez was released by the Cardinals organization.

Philadelphia Phillies
On April 1, 2022, Sánchez signed a minor league contract with the Philadelphia Phillies organization. He made 21 starts for the Triple-A Lehigh Valley IronPigs, pitching to a 6-4 record and 4.79 ERA with 83 strikeouts in 92.0 innings of work.

Detroit Tigers
On August 14, 2022, the Phillies traded Sánchez to the Detroit Tigers for cash considerations. Sánchez closed out the year starting 5 games for the Triple-A Toledo Mud Hens, working to a 1-1 record and 5.55 ERA with 20 strikeouts in 24.1 innings pitched. He was released on October 27.

Chicago White Sox
On February 23, 2023, Sánchez signed a minor league contract with the Chicago White Sox organization.

References

External links

1997 births
Living people
People from Puerto Cabello
Major League Baseball players from Venezuela
Venezuelan expatriate baseball players in the United States
Major League Baseball pitchers
St. Louis Cardinals players
Arizona League Angels players
Rome Braves players
Florida Fire Frogs players
Gulf Coast Braves players
Danville Braves players
Mississippi Braves players
Navegantes del Magallanes players
Arkansas Travelers players